Alf Sommerfelt (November 23, 1892October 12, 1965), was a Norwegian linguist and the first professor of linguistics in Norway, working at the University of Oslo from 1931 to 1962.

Personal life
Sommerfelt was born in Trondheim, Norway.  He married the young adult literature writer Aimée Sommerfelt.  He died in Nes, Norway, aged 72.

Linguistics work

Sommerfelt was a central figure in the introduction of structuralism in Norway. He had studied in Paris, and held lectures on Saussure, glossematics, the Prague school and American structuralism. People at the Nordic institutes, on the other hand, didn't subscribe to Sommerfelt's methods, and there was little contact between them and the structuralists until the 1960s.

Together with the Slavicist Olaf Broch, Sommerfelt founded  the Norwegian association for linguistics in 1924, an association that would play an important part in the introduction of new linguistic theories to Norway.

Sommerfelt wrote several popular introductions to linguistics. He also wrote an introductory book on general linguistics (1947), a book read by all the linguistics students at the university of Oslo, and reprinted ten years later. Sommerfelt was also one of the editors of Norsk riksmålsordbog (the Norwegian Riksmål dictionary).

Selected bibliography
 Sommerfelt, Alf 1921: Le Breton parlé a Saint-Pol-de-Leon : Phonétique et morphologie
 Sommerfelt, Alf 1922: The dialect of Torr Co. Donegal. Videnskapsselskapets skrifter II. Hist.-filos. kl. 1-2
 Sommerfelt, Alf 1934:Hvordan sproget blir til : en oversikt over sprogets rolle i samfundene Oslo : Cappelens forlag.
 Sommerfelt, Alf 1947: Almen språkvitenskap : (det propedeutiske kursus).

References
Hovdhaugen, Even, Fred Karlsson, Carol Henriksen and Bengt Sigurd 2000: The History of Linguistics in the Nordic Countries. Helsinki: Societas Scientiarum Fennica.

1892 births
1965 deaths
People from Trondheim
Academic staff of the University of Oslo
Linguists from Norway
Structuralists
Norwegian people of World War II
Road incident deaths in Norway
20th-century linguists